Asid ibn Kurz al-Bajali and his son Yazid ibn Asid were companions of the Islamic prophet Muhammad.

Lineage 
Asad ibn Kurz ibn Amir ibn Abd Allah ibn Abd al-Shams ibn Ghamghama ibn Jarir ibn Shaq ibn Saab ibn Yashkar ibn Raham ibn Afraq ibn Afsa ibn Nazir ibn Qasr ibn Abqar ibn Anmar al-Bajali

Virtues
When he converted to Islam together with someone from Banu Thaqif, he presented a bow to Muhammad and then asked for and received his blessings.

Hadith narrations
The tabi'in who took the narration from him included Dhamra ibn Habib and Asid's own grandson Khalid ibn Abd Allah ibn Asid. It is recorded that he narrated several hadiths, including the command to love and love others as we love ourselves and hadiths about disease fever that can abort sin sufferers.

References

Companions of the Prophet